Kosmos 148 ( meaning Cosmos 148), also known as DS-P1-I No.2 was a satellite which was used as a radar target for anti-ballistic missile tests.

It was launched aboard a Kosmos-2I 63SM rocket, from Site 133/1 at Plesetsk. The launch occurred at 17:30 GMT on 16 March 1967. This was the first DS-P1-I launch to use the Kosmos-2I 63SM, which replaced the earlier 63S1 model. It was also the first launch from Site 133 at the Plesetsk Cosmodrome.

It decayed from orbit on 7 May 1967.

Kosmos 148 was the second of nineteen DS-P1-I satellites to be launched. Of these, all reached orbit successfully except the DS-P1-I No.6 (seventh, launched out of sequence).

See also

 1967 in spaceflight

References

Spacecraft launched in 1967
Kosmos 0148
1967 in the Soviet Union
Dnepropetrovsk Sputnik program